The Folgers Coffee Company Building is a historic mid-rise office building located at 101 Howard Street in the Financial District, San Francisco.

Description and history 
The five-story plus basement, Renaissance Revival style building was originally built in 1904 as the headquarters of J. A. Folger & Company, and remained the main offices of the company until 1963 when Folger's Coffee was purchased by Procter & Gamble. As described by its NRHP designation, it is, “unusual and noteworthy in that the building survived both of the major San Francisco earthquakes in 1906 and 1989.” One reason for this is that it was, “constructed on wooden pilings that were driven into San Francisco Bay fill to a depth of about forty feet, with a steam driven pile driver.”

On August 2, 2011, The Folger Building was purchased by the University of San Francisco, for almost $37 million. This marked the return of the university's downtown roots. It has no LEED certification, as is typical of buildings from its time, and has 83,500 square feet of rentable office space.

The building was listed on the National Register of Historic Places on June 21, 1996.

References

Office buildings in San Francisco
National Register of Historic Places in San Francisco
Commercial buildings on the National Register of Historic Places in California
Coffee companies of the United States
Renaissance Revival architecture in California
Commercial buildings completed in 1904